Mary Crowell Van Benschoten (Crowell; November 18, 1840 – March 29, 1921) was an American author and clubwoman. Through her pen, she led an active life, contributing to various papers and publishing a paper herself at one time. She was a charter member of the Illinois Woman's Press Association.

Early life and education
Mary Crowell was born in Brooklyn, New York, November 18, 1840. Her parents were William Whitney Crowell and Elizabeth (Owens) Crowell. William's father was John Crowell of Brunswick, Maine, and his grandfather, Thomas Crowell, was an instructor in Bowdoin College.

She was educated in Brooklyn and New York City. In youth, she displayed dramatic and elocutionary talents, and gave many entertaining shows which aided charities.

Career
Benschoten began to publish poems and short stories in her early life. She contributed to the Chicago Times, Chicago Tribune, Chicago Inter Ocean, and other journals. She served as a correspondent for the Brooklyn Argus.

Benschoten was Frances Willard's first secretary.

She was one of the charter members of the Illinois Social Science Association, a charter member of the Woman's Club of Evanston, and one of the first secretaries of the Woman's Christian Temperance Union (WCTU). She was a member of the Illinois Press Association and of the Chicago Woman's Club. She served as one of the managers of the Chicago Woman's Exchange. She was trustee of the Illinois Industrial School for Girls (now Park Ridge Youth Campus) at South Evanston for fifteen years, and for eight years, she edited the organ of that school, The Record and Appeal. Established in 1884, the paper recorded the work of the home and appealed for sympathy and help.

Personal life
At an early age, she married Samuel Van Benschoten, of New York City, and they removed to Evanston, Illinois in 1872 where Samuel became western representative for several eastern manufacturing houses. Their family consisted of two children, May (b. 1865) and William (b. 1870).

Mary Crowell Van Benschoten died March 29, 1921, at the Chicago residence of her son, William. She was 80 years old.

References

External links
 

1840 births
1921 deaths
19th-century American writers
20th-century American writers
19th-century American women writers
20th-century American women writers
Wikipedia articles incorporating text from A Woman of the Century
19th-century American newspaper publishers (people)
Writers from Brooklyn
Clubwomen
American newspaper reporters and correspondents
People from Evanston, Illinois